Medgidia Clinker Storage Facility is the largest dome-type cement clinker storage facility in the world and one of the largest dome-type structures in Romania. It is operated by CRH and situated at Medgidia. The storage facility, which was completed in 2009, can store 250,000 cubic metres of clinker.

External links 
 http://www.wall-street.ro/articol/English-Version/75624/The-Lafarge-Romania-director-2009-the-first-year-with-a-drop-since-our-arrival-here.html

Buildings and structures in Constanța County
2009 establishments in Romania